VanceInfo (officially VanceInfo Technologies Inc.) is an IT outsourcing company headquartered in Beijing, China. It ranks first among Chinese offshore software development service providers for the North American and European markets as measured by 2010 revenues.  The service areas of the company are in tech, telecom, finance, travel, manufacturing, retail and logistics.

In November 2012, the company merged with China-based IT outsourcing industry peer HiSoft to form Pactera.

History
The company was founded in 1995 as Worksoft and started its long-term relationship with IBM.  The company added an office in Dalian in 2004, and in that same year signed a contract with Unicom-BREW and built the PeopleSoft China Development Center.  In the next year important achievements included the building of the TIBCO China Development Center and selection as a Microsoft Preferred Vendor and built its China Offshore Development Centers in Shanghai and Beijing.  In that year, the company expanded by acquiring SureKAM and the US-based Siebel consultancy Envisys, and secured financing from funding by Hao Chen, Legend Capital and Rob Theis, Doll Capital Management (DCM).  More venture capital funding following in 2006 from Kui Zhou and Doug Leone of Sequoia Capital.  The company also in 2006 acquired China-based Prosoft Technology.  2007 was a marquee year in which the company changed its name to VanceInfo and listed on the NYSE, and opened offices in the US in Seattle, Washington and New York.  Further international expansion occurred in 2009 with the opening of a London office and a Melbourne, Australia office in 2010.

The company emerged in the backdrop of partisan political bickering in the US state of Ohio in 2010–2011.  A group of state representatives allied with Service Employees International Union District 199, a branch of a major trade union, pointed out that Mark Kvamme, a political appointee put in charge of creating jobs in Ohio, was a partner in Sequoia Capital, which had invested in VanceInfo.  The state representatives and union branded Kvamme as unfit for the role of creating jobs in the state since he was tied to VanceInfo, an outsourcing company, through his stake in Sequoia Capital.  One of the representatives said: "It seems utterly contradictory that a guy who's the state's leading job creator, supposedly, is trying to bring jobs to the state of Ohio ... while in his private life is benefitting from outsourcing IT jobs to China."

Offices
Headquartered in Beijing, VanceInfo has additional offices in Shanghai, Nanjing, Shenzhen, Dalian, Hangzhou, Guangzhou, Tianjin, Wuhan, Chengdu, Xi'an, Hong Kong, Melbourne, Tokyo, Kuala Lumpur, San Diego, Seattle, San Francisco, New York and London.

See also
Software industry in China
China Software Industry Association

Notes 

Companies formerly listed on the New York Stock Exchange
Companies based in Beijing
Business process outsourcing companies
Technology companies established in 1995
Outsourcing companies
1995 establishments in China